Sergey Litvinov may refer to:
Sergey Litvinov (athlete, born 1958) (1958–2018), Russian hammer thrower
Sergey Litvinov (athlete, born 1986), Russian hammer thrower, son of the above